Göhrde is a municipality in the district of Lüchow-Dannenberg, in Lower Saxony, Germany.

The hunting lodge situated in the forest was built in 1689 and was restored by Ernest Augustus, King of Hanover. It is known to history on account of the constitution of Gohrde, promulgated here in 1719.

It is also notable for the Battle of the Göhrde on 16 September 1813 during the War of the Sixth Coalition, in which Allied forces under Wallmoden defeated the French forces commanded by Pécheux.

References

Lüchow-Dannenberg